The Norwegian Golf Tour was a developmental professional golf tour based in Norway. In the past, similar to the Danish Golf Tour and the Swedish Golf Tour, most events on the Norwegian Golf Tour schedules were incorporated into the Nordic Golf League, one of the four third-tier tours recognized by the European Tour.

History
The tour was founded in 2004 by the Norwegian Golf Federation and the PGA of Norway. The tour aimed to offer a series of tournaments for elite-level golfers in Norway (both amateur and professional). The inaugural title sponsor of the tour was P4 Radio Hele Norge.

2007 season

Schedule
The following table lists official events during the 2007 season.

2006 season

Schedule
The following table lists official events during the 2006 season.

Order of Merit
The Order of Merit was based on prize money won during the season, calculated using a points-based system.

2005 season

Schedule
The following table lists official events during the 2005 season.

Order of Merit
The Order of Merit was based on prize money won during the season, calculated using a points-based system.

2004 season

Schedule
The following table lists official events during the 2004 season.

Order of Merit
The Order of Merit was based on prize money won during the season, calculated using a points-based system.

Order of Merit winners

See also
 Danish Golf Tour
 Finnish Tour
 Nordic Golf League
 Swedish Golf Tour

Notes

References

Professional golf tours
Golf in Norway
2004 establishments in Norway